Johns Creek is a stream in Ste. Genevieve County in the U.S. state of Missouri. It is a tributary of Saline Creek.

Johns Creek has the name of the local John family.

See also
List of rivers of Missouri

References

Rivers of Ste. Genevieve County, Missouri
Rivers of Missouri